Ferrabosco is the name of several musicians and composers, all from a family originating in Bologna:

 Domenico Ferrabosco (1513–1574), Italian composer and singer
 Alfonso Ferrabosco the elder (1543–1588), Italian composer mainly active in England, and instrumental in bringing the Italian madrigal there; eldest son of Domenico Ferrabosco
 Alfonso Ferrabosco the younger (1575–1628), English composer, son of Alfonso the elder, also a singer, and performer on the lute and viol
 Alfonso Ferrabosco III (junior) (died 1652), an English composer and court musician, son of Ferrabosco the younger 
 Henry Ferrabosco (died 1658?), a court musician before and during the First English Civil War, son of Ferrabosco the younger
 John Ferrabosco (1626–1682), English organist and composer, youngest son of Alfonso Ferrabosco the younger
 Matthia Ferrabosco (1550–1616), Italian singer and composer
 Constantino Ferrabosco (late 16th century), Italian composer, probably the brother of Matthia